Kennaway may refer to:

Places
Kennaway, Ontario, a dispersed rural community in the municipality of Dysart et al., Ontario, Canada
Kennaway Lake, a lake just south of the above community
Kennaway House, Sidmouth, East Devon, Great Britain

People with the name
Kennaway (surname)
Kennaway baronets, a title in the Baronetage of Great Britain in Hyderabad, East Indies
Kennaway Henderson (1879–1960), New Zealand clerk, illustrator, cartoonist, editor and pacifist

See also
Kennoway, a village in Fife, Scotland